The Val d'Anniviers (old name in German Eifischtal) is a Swiss Alpine valley, situated in the district of Sierre in Valais, which extends south of the Rhône Valley, on the northern slopes of the Pennine Alps. The valley was home to six municipalities:  Ayer, Chandolin, Grimentz, Saint-Jean, Saint-Luc and Vissoie. The citizens of those municipalities agreed on November 26, 2006, to merge into one, which was named Anniviers. The merger took place in January 2009.

Toponymy
The name of the valley has changed little during its history: "vallis Annivesii" before 1052, then "de Anivesio" in 1193, "Annivies" in 1215, "Anives" in 1243 and "Annevié" in 1253.

The origin and meaning of the name "Anniviers" are uncertain and have been interpreted in different ways from Latin. According to the sociologist Bernard Crettaz, it would find its origin in the seasonal migration of its inhabitants between the mountain and the plain: the etymology would refer to "Anni viae", meaning "year on the paths", "paths of the year" or "work of the year". The other possible interpretations are, among others, "Ad nives" ("towards the snows") or "Anni visio" ("visit of the year", in reference to the annual visit of the bishop).

In the local variety of Arpitan, Anniviers is called "Anivyè". The German form "Eifischtal", still used in some publications, would have similar origins to that in French; however, it has no connection with fish (Fisch in German).

The inhabitants of the valley are called the Anniviards.

Geography

Situation
The Val d'Anniviers is located in the canton of Valais and is one of the seven large valleys of the Swiss Rhône Valley. It is located on the left bank of the Rhône, between the Vallon de Réchy and the Illgraben and opposite Sierre.

Seismicity, landslides and avalanches
The Val d'Anniviers is located in seismic risk zone 3b, the category of the most exposed regions in Switzerland. The valley is also in a high avalanche risk zone.

The Val d'Anniviers has experienced a number of natural disasters. The oldest known dates back to the 6th century when, after heavy snowfalls during the winter followed by long storms and torrential rains in the spring, a section of the Tsirouc mountain collapsed on the village of Morasses. By freeing itself due to spring warming and thunderstorms, the basin gave way to a second avalanche, two days later, coming from the face of the Roc d'Orzival and ending in the village.

References

Notes

External links
Official web site

Bibliography
 
 
 
 
 
 
 

Valleys of the Alps
Valleys of Switzerland
Landforms of Valais
Ski areas and resorts in Switzerland
Anniviers